Said Sadiq is a city in the Sulaymaniyah Governorate, in the Kurdistan Region, Iraq. The nearby archaeological site of Tell Begum shows that the area was already occupied in the Late Halaf period.

Notable people 
 Wali Dewane (1826–1881), poet.

References

District capitals of Iraq
Sulaymaniyah Governorate
Kurdish settlements in Iraq